Serolis is a genus of isopod crustacean, containing the following species:
Serolis antarctica Beddard, 1886
Serolis arntzi Brandt, 2003
Serolis aspera Sheppard, 1933
Serolis glacialis (Tattersall, 1921)
Serolis gracilis Beddard, 1884
Serolis hoshiaii Nunomura, 2005
Serolis insignis Moreira, 1977
Serolis kempi Sheppard, 1933
Serolis leachi Brandt, 1988
Serolis paradoxa (Fabricius, 1775)
Serolis reptans Brandt, 1988
Serolis rugosa Kussakin, 1982
Serolis serresi Lucas, 1877
Serolis zoiphila Stechow, 1921

References

Sphaeromatidea